Vertner Woodson Tandy (May 17, 1885 – November 7, 1949) was an American architect. He was one of the seven founders (commonly referred to as "The Seven Jewels") of Alpha Phi Alpha fraternity at Cornell University in 1906. He was the first African American registered architect in New York State.  Tandy served as the first treasurer of the Alpha chapter and the designer of the fraternity pin. The fraternity became incorporated under his auspices.

Early life and education
He was born on May 17, 1885, in Lexington, Kentucky. His parents were Henry A. Tandy and Emma Brice Tandy. Henry Tandy was a successful entrepreneur and building contractor. Born enslaved, in 1893 he established the firm Tandy & Byrd in Lexington. Among prominent projects of the firm are the Lexington Opera House and the Fayette County Courthouse, now the site of the Lexington Visitor Center.

In 1904 Tandy attended Tuskegee Institute studying architectural drawing. In 1905 he transferred to Cornell University, which he graduated from in 1907 with a degree in architecture. He was one of the founding members, who were collectively called the "Seven Jewels," of the Alpha Phi Alpha Society the first African-American fraternity in 1906.

Career 
Ater graduation, Tandy and George Washington Foster started their own firm, Tandy & Foster, with offices on Broadway in New York City. Tandy became the State of New York’s first registered black architect.

Tandy's most famous commission was probably Villa Lewaro, the $250,000 mansion for the daughter of the Harlem millionairess Madam C. J. Walker, in Irvington on Hudson, New York. The Italianate-style mansion was completed in 1918 and became important in the Harlem Renaissance prior to Walker’s death. Among his other extant work are the Ivey Delph Apartments, and St. Philip's Episcopal Church at 204 West 134th Street in Harlem, through his architectural firm of Tandy & Foster.  The Ivey Delph Apartments, designed in 1948, was listed on the National Register of Historic Places in 2005.

Tandy also holds the distinction of being the first African American to pass the military commissioning examination and was commissioned First Lieutenant in the 15th Infantry of the New York State National Guard.

Death 
Vertner W. Tandy died of pneumonia on November 7, 1949, aged 64, in Manhattan, New York City. He is honored with a historic marker in Lexington KY installed in 2009.

References

Further reading

External links

Alpha Phi Alpha website

1885 births
1949 deaths
Alpha Phi Alpha founders
Cornell University College of Architecture, Art, and Planning alumni
Tuskegee University alumni
Architects from New York City
African-American architects
American ecclesiastical architects
369th Infantry Regiment personnel
Deaths from pneumonia in New York City
20th-century American architects
20th-century African-American artists